St Wilfrid's RC College is a mixed Roman Catholic secondary school and sixth form located in South Shields, South Tyneside, England.

St Wilfrid's RC College was previously a voluntary aided school and Mathematics and Computing College administered by South Tyneside Metropolitan Borough Council. In January 2016 the school was converted to academy status, however St Wilfrid's continues to coordinate with South Tyneside Metropolitan Borough Council for admissions. The school continues to be under the guidance of the Roman Catholic Diocese of Hexham and Newcastle.

References

External links

Secondary schools in the Metropolitan Borough of South Tyneside
Catholic secondary schools in the Diocese of Hexham and Newcastle
Academies in the Metropolitan Borough of South Tyneside
Education in South Shields